Frank Sebastian Giorgi (born 22 September 1981) is an Australian-Italian Muay Thai kickboxer who competes in the middleweight division. Known for his boxing skills, Giorgi made a name for himself domestically by becoming a two-time Australian champion before emerging internationally in 2011 when he won his first world title and reached the final of the Thai Fight 70 kg/154 lb Tournament in Thailand.

Early life

An Italian Australian and a stonemason by trade, Giorgi was born to Italian parents (San Luca) in Adelaide, South Australia in 1981 and raised on the Gold Coast, Queensland. He was first introduced to combat sports at the age of twelve when his uncle Frank Mesiti took him to a boxing gym in Southport, Queensland.

There he met his partner of 15 years Amy Cameron who was a Muay Thai fighter at the time. Admittedly, he was never dedicated to boxing and, although he had a small number of amateur boxing matches, he eventually switched to Muay Thai and began fighting after six months' of training.

Career
Giorgi turned professional after eleven amateur fights and lost to Ben NTG in his debut. After initially starting out training under Richard Walsh at Five Rings Dojo, where he was a training partner of Australian great Nathan Corbett, he later became a student of Arslan Magomedov at Scorpion Gym following a period of upheaval. He established himself domestically by capturing both the WKN and the WMC national titles and taking wins over the likes of Bruce Macfie. Giorgi made the pilgrimage to Thailand for the first time in 2005 and would later win the Shell Tournament at Omnoi Stadium in Bangkok.

On 9 April 2011, he rematched Bruce Macfie at Evolution 23 in Brisbane, Australia and won by unanimous decision to take the WMC Intercontinental Super Middleweight (−76.2 kg/168 lb) Championship.

Following this, Giorgi was selected as a participant on The Challenger Muay Thai reality television show in Kuala Lumpur, Malaysia, which featured sixteen fighters from around the world competing for a $100,000 prize. He was eliminated at the opening stage when he lost to eventual finalist Marco Piqué on points.

He was then scheduled to face the legendary John Wayne Parr for the WMC World Middleweight (−72.58 kg/160 lb) title at Evolution 24 in Brisbane on 3 September 2011 but Parr was forced to withdraw after suffering a hand injury in training and Nonsai Srisuk came in as his replacement. Giorgi defeated the Thai by split decision after an entertaining, back-and-forth fight to become a world champion for the first time.

Just twenty-two days later, he was back in action in the quarter-finals of the Thai Fight 2011 70 kg/154 lb Tournament in Bangkok where he outpointed Vuyisile Colossa to book his place in the semis against Abraham Roqueñi on 27 November 2011. The Spaniard hurt him twice in the second round but was unable to finish him off and Giorgi came back to steal the fight in the third, roughing up Roqueñi in the clinch. He met Thai superstar Buakaw Por. Pramuk in the final on 18 December 2011 and lost on the judges' scorecards. Buakaw delivered a virtuoso performance, delivering punches to the head and body, thips, knees and sweeps that Giorgi simply couldn't defend against.

On 27 April 2012, Giorgi defeated Tobias Alexandersson on points on the Gold Coast to win the vacant WKN World Welterweight (−69.9 kg/154.1 lb) Muay Thai strap. He had originally been set to face Antuan Siangboxing but he was injured and had to pull out. Two weeks later in Melbourne, Australia, he went up against Steve Moxon in a match that many believed would crown the country's top 70 kg/154 lb kickfighter. With Giorgi being a Muay Thai stylist and Moxon a kickboxer, the fight took place under modified Muay Thai rules which excluded elbow strikes. Moxon floored Giorgi in the first round, but Giorgi then kept him at bay with kicks for the next four and was given the nod via split decision.

In July 2012, Giorgi moved into the top ten in the middleweight world rankings for the first time in his career, coming in at #7. A rematch with Nonsai was set to go down at Total Carnage II on the Gold Coast on 1 September 2012 but Rhyse Saliba stepped in as a late replacement for Nonsai who could not enter the country due to visa issues, and Giorgi defeated him via a clear cut unanimous decision. Overtaken by up-and-coming European talent such as Shemsi Beqiri, Murthel Groenhart and Davit Kiria, Giorgi dropped out of the middleweight world rankings in December 2012.

He took on surging Thai Aikpracha Meenayothin at Yokkao Extreme 2013 in Milan, Italy on 26 January 2013 and was dropped twice in round two, once with a left cross and then again with a high kick, causing the referee to wave off the fight.

He defeated Elliot Compton at Legacy 2 in Queensland on 22 November 2013.

At Total Carnage IV held in Gold Coast on 14 December 2013, Giorgi lost a unanimous decision to Marco Tentori.

On 13 May 2016 Giorgi took TKO victory over Harald Olsen at Thunderdome XV in Perth, Australia

Personal life
Giorgi has two sons, Sebastian and Frankie, with his partner of 15 years Amy and is a Catholic.

He also follows football and supports AC Milan.

Championships and awards

Kickboxing
Omnoi Stadium
Shell Tournament Championship
Thai Fight
Thai Fight 2011 70 kg/154 lb Tournament Runner-up
World Kickboxing Network
WKN Australian Super Welterweight (-72.6 kg/160 lb) Championship
WKN World Welterweight (−69.9 kg/154.1 lb) Muay Thai Championship
World Muaythai Council
WMC Australian Championship
WMC Intercontinental Super Middleweight (−76.2 kg/168 lb) Championship
WMC World Middleweight (−72.58 kg/160 lb) Championship

Kickboxing record

|-  bgcolor="#FFBBBB"
| 2016-10-14 || Loss ||align=left| Brad Riddell || Powerplay Promotions 31 || Australia || Decision (Split) || 5 || 3:00
|-
|-  bgcolor="#FFBBBB"
| 2013-12-14 || Loss ||align=left| Marco Tentori || Total Carnage IV || Gold Coast, Queensland || Decision (unanimous) || 5 || 3:00
|-
|-  bgcolor="#CCFFCC"
| 2013-11-22 || Win ||align=left| Elliott Compton || Legacy 2 || Queensland, Australia ||  ||  || 
|-
|-  bgcolor="#FFBBBB"
| 2013-01-26 || Loss ||align=left| Aikpracha Meenayothin || Yokkao Extreme 2013 || Milan, Italy || TKO (high kick) || 2 || 
|-
|-  bgcolor="#CCFFCC"
| 2012-09-01 || Win ||align=left| Rhyse Saliba || Total Carnage II || Gold Coast, Queensland || Decision (unanimous) || 5 || 3:00
|-
|-  bgcolor="#CCFFCC"
| 2012-04-28 || Win ||align=left| Steve Moxon || The Showdown || Melbourne, Australia || Decision (split) || 3 || 3:00
|-
|-  bgcolor="#CCFFCC"
| 2012-04-07 || Win ||align=left| Tobias Alexandersson || Total Carnage I || Gold Coast, Queensland || Decision || 5 || 3:00
|-
! style=background:white colspan=9 |
|-
|-  bgcolor="#FFBBBB"
| 2011-12-18 || Loss ||align=left| Buakaw Por. Pramuk || THAI FIGHT 2011 – 70 kg Tournament Final || Bangkok, Thailand || Decision || 3 || 3:00
|-
! style=background:white colspan=9 |
|-
|-  bgcolor="#CCFFCC"
| 2011-11-27 || Win ||align=left| Abraham Roqueñi || THAI FIGHT 2011 – 70 kg Tournament Semi Finals || Bangkok, Thailand || Decision || 3 || 3:00
|-
|-  bgcolor="#CCFFCC"
| 2011-09-25 || Win ||align=left| Vuyisile Colossa || THAI FIGHT 2011 – 70 kg Tournament Quarter Finals || Bangkok, Thailand || Decision || 3 || 3:00
|-
|-  bgcolor="#CCFFCC"
| 2011-09-03 || Win ||align=left| Nonsai Srisuk || Evolution 24 || Brisbane, Australia || Decision (split) || 5 || 3:00
|-
! style=background:white colspan=9 |
|-
|-  bgcolor="#FFBBBB"
| in 2011 || Loss ||align=left| Marco Piqué || The Challenger Muay Thai, First Round || Kuala Lumpur, Malaysia || Decision || 5 || 3:00
|-
|-  bgcolor="#CCFFCC"
| 2011-04-09 || Win ||align=left| Bruce Macfie || Evolution 23 || Brisbane, Australia || Decision (unanimous) || 5 || 3:00
|-
! style=background:white colspan=9 |
|-
|-  bgcolor="#CCFFCC"
| 2010-11-27 || Win ||align=left| Bruce Macfie || Evolution 22 || Brisbane, Australia || KO || 2 || 
|-
|-  bgcolor="#CCFFCC"
| 2010-10-30 || Win ||align=left| Tum Mardsua || War on the Shore 18 || Gold Coast, Queensland || KO || || 
|-
|-  bgcolor="#CCFFCC"
| 2010-03-13 || Win ||align=left| Dusan Salva || Domination 4 || Bentley, Australia || Decision || 5 || 3:00
|-
! style=background:white colspan=9 |
|-
|-  bgcolor="#CCFFCC"
| 2009-11-14 || Win ||align=left| Andrew Rakowski || Knees of Fury 27 || Adelaide, Australia || TKO (cut) || 1 || 
|-
|-  bgcolor="#CCFFCC"
| in 2007 || Win ||align=left| Dong Jiang Tao || Xplosion 17 || Gold Coast, Queensland || KO (right low kick) || 2 || 
|-
|-  bgcolor="#CCFFCC"
| 2007-06-22 || Win ||align=left| Brad Small || Xplosion 16 || Gold Coast, Queensland || TKO (punches) || 2 || 
|-
|-  bgcolor="#CCFFCC"
| 2006-11-25 || Win ||align=left| Eli Madigan || Evolution 9 || Brisbane, Australia || || || 
|-
|-  bgcolor="#FFBBBB"
| 2005-11-15 || Loss ||align=left| Andrew Keogh || Evolution 6 || Brisbane, Australia || Decision (split) || 3 || 3:00
|-
|-
| colspan=9 | Legend:

References

External links
 Official site

1981 births
Living people
Australian male kickboxers
Middleweight kickboxers
Australian Muay Thai practitioners
Sportspeople from Adelaide
Sportspeople from the Gold Coast, Queensland
Australian people of Italian descent
Australian stonemasons